Muteesa (variably spelled Mutesa or Mutessa) may refer to:

Muteesa I of Buganda, the 30th Kabaka of Buganda who reigned between 1856 and 1884.
Muteesa II of Buganda, the 36th Kabaka of Buganda who reigned between 1939 and 1969. He also was the first President of Independent Uganda:1962 to 1966.